Lotus Center is the first and largest shopping mall in Oradea, Romania. It was opened under the name of Lotus Market in 2002 by the local businessman Alexandru Mudura. In 2006 the shopping mall has undergone several modernization and expansion works.

The center include around 150 stores, a multiplex, a hypermarket, restaurants and luxury shops.

References

External links
 Official website

Buildings and structures in Bihor County
Shopping malls in Oradea